Ingénieur Général Haarbleicher was a  cargo ship which was built in 1944 for the Ministry of War Transport (MoWT) as Empire Call. In 1945 she was sold to the French government and renamed Ingénieur Général Haarbleicher. In November 1945, she ran aground on Stromboli and broke in two. Declared a total loss, she was scrapped in 1947.

Description
The ship was built by William Hamilton & Co Ltd, Port Glasgow. Yard number 462, she was launched on 10 February 1944 and completed in July.

She had a GRT of 7,067 and a NRT of 4,759. The engine was built by Harland & Wolff, Glasgow.

History

Empire Call
Empire Call was built for the MoWT. She was operated under the management of Gibbs & Co Ltd. She was allocated the United Kingdom Official Number 169509 and used the Code Letters GCWK. Her port of registry was Greenock.

Empire Call was a member of a number of convoys during the Second World War.

SC 159
Convoy SC 159 departed Halifax, Nova Scotia on 18 October 1944 and arrived at Liverpool on 2 November. Empire Call was carrying a cargo of flour, destined for Cardiff.

ONS 97
Convoy ONS 97 departed Belfast Lough on 29 November 1944. Empire Call was bound for New York.

Ingénieur Général Haarbleicher
In 1945, Empire Call was sold to the French government, who renamed her Ingénieur Général Haarbleicher and placed her under the control of the Ministère de la Marine Merchande. She was operated under the management of Compagnie Générale Transatlantique. Her Code Letters were changed to FPPK and her port of registry to Marseilles. The ship was named in honour of a French engineer who had been shot by the Germans during the Second World War.

On 18 November 1945, Ingénieur Général Haarbleicher departed Marseilles bound for Saigon, French Indo-China. On 20 November. she ran aground on Stromboli, Italy  in fog. The tug Hippopotame was despatched from Bizerte on 26 November, followed by the Camille Porch from Marseilles on 28 November. Camille Porch was carrying divers and pumping equipment. On 3 December, work started to unload the ship's cargo into barges brought from Messina, but during the evening of 4 December a storm blew up. The ship was abandoned at 02:15 on 5 December and later broke in two. She was declared a total loss. Ingénieur Général Haarbleicher was scrapped in situ in 1947.

References

External links
 Photo of Ingénieur Général Haarbleicher

1944 ships
Ships built on the River Clyde
Empire ships
Maritime incidents in November 1945
Merchant ships of France
Ministry of War Transport ships
Ships of the Compagnie Générale Transatlantique
Steamships of France
Steamships of the United Kingdom